Roy Thomas Barker (d. 2011) was dean of Grahamstown from 1980 until 1992.

Barker was educated at King's College London and Warminster Theological College; and ordained in 1959. After curacies in Leeds he was chaplain at the University of Cape Town from 1966 until 1972. He was then sub dean of Cape Town from 1973 until his appointment in Grahamstown.

Barker died in November 2011.

References 

Alumni of King's College London
Alumni of St Boniface Missionary College, Warminster
Deans of Grahamstown